The Sauber C15 was the car with which the Sauber team competed in the 1996 Formula One World Championship. It was powered by the Ford Zetec-R V10 engine and driven by German Heinz-Harald Frentzen, who was in his third season with the team, and Briton Johnny Herbert, who moved from Benetton.

Overview
Problems with the new unit's power delivery resulted in the team scoring only 11 points, despite the theoretical power advantage over a V8.

The drivers proved well-matched, with Frentzen having a slight edge over Herbert. Heinz-Harald scored further points at Catalunya and Suzuka.

The team eventually finished seventh in the Constructors' Championship, with 11 points.

Complete Formula One results 
(key) (results in bold indicate pole position)

References 
 

C15
1996 Formula One season cars